Kevin Harwick Tancharoen (born April 23, 1984) is an American director, producer, screenwriter, dancer, and choreographer. On September 29, 2011, New Line Cinema/Warner Bros. announced that Tancharoen would be helming a big-screen adaptation of Mortal Kombat after he created the successful web series Mortal Kombat: Legacy, although he dropped out of the project in 2013.

Life and career
Tancharoen was born in Los Angeles, California. He is the brother of writer and producer Maurissa Tancharoen (and brother-in-law of Jed Whedon) and the son of Tommy Tancharoen.

He is known for being a choreographer for Madonna, directing Britney Spears' "The Onyx Hotel Tour" and co-creating DanceLife on MTV.

He made his feature film directorial debut in 2009 with the remake of the 1980 film Fame. In 2010, Tancharoen directed the short film Mortal Kombat: Rebirth as a proof of concept for his vision of a new Mortal Kombat feature. From that, he directed and produced the Mortal Kombat: Legacy web series.

In 2011, Tancharoen directed Glee: The 3D Concert Movie, a 3D concert film of the Glee Live! In Concert! tour based on the musical TV series. On September 29, 2011, New Line Cinema/Warner Bros. announced that Kevin Tancharoen had signed on to direct a new big-screen adaptation of Mortal Kombat, but he backed out of the project in October 2013. In an interview, Tancharoen told Nerd Reactor that he is still planning to direct season 3 of Mortal Kombat: Legacy.

Filmography
Film
Fame (2009)
Mortal Kombat: Rebirth (2010; also screenwriter, producer and editor)
Glee: The 3D Concert Movie (2011)
Arcana (2011)

Television
Britney Spears Live from Miami (2004)
The JammX Kids (2004)
Twentyfourseven (2006)
Dancelife (2006; 8 episodes, also co-executive producer)
Pussycat Dolls Present: The Search for the Next Doll (2007)
Mortal Kombat: Legacy (2011–2013; co-developer)
Sequestered (2014; 8 episodes, also co-producer)
Agents of S.H.I.E.L.D. (2014–2020; 16 episodes)
The Flash (2015–2018; 3 episodes)
Supergirl (2015; 1 episode)
12 Monkeys (2016; 1 episode)
Arrow (2016–2018; 3 episodes)
Legends of Tomorrow (2016–2017; 2 episodes)
Midnight, Texas (2017; 1 episode)
Prison Break (2017; 2 episodes)
Iron Fist (2017; 1 episode)
Star (2017–2018; 2 episodes)
Inhumans (2017; 1 episode)
Deception (2018; 1 episode)
Warrior (2019; 1 episode)
Titans (2019; 1 episode)
A Million Little Things (2019; 1 episode)
Tell Me a Story (2020; 1 episode)
Helstrom (2020; 1 episode)
The Book of Boba Fett (2022; 1 episode)
Other
You Got Served (2004, actor) as Dancer
Strange Fruit (2008; editor and composer)
Mortal Kombat: Rebirth (2010; producer)
Mobbed (2011; consulting producer)

Personal life
Tancharoen started dating actress, Ashley Edner in May 2019. They became engaged in September 2020 after 14 months of dating. They married on February 12, 2022.

References

External links

1984 births
American choreographers
Television producers from California
American male dancers
Living people
American film directors of Thai descent
American television directors
Film directors from Los Angeles